The 1940 South Carolina hurricane was a Category 2 hurricane that struck the Georgia and South Carolina coast between August 11 and 12, 1940. After forming north of the Leeward Islands, the storm moved west-northwest, moving east of the Bahamas before resuming a west-northwest track towards the Southeastern United States. Hurricane warnings were in effect for the United States coastline near and north of where the center made landfall. Significant flooding and landslides struck Georgia, North Carolina, Tennessee, and Virginia during the system's slow trek as a weakening tropical storm, and then as an extratropical cyclone, through the Southeast. The landslides which struck North Carolina were considered a once in a century event. Damages relating to the storm totaled $13 million (1940 USD) and 50 people perished.

Meteorological history 

Morning weather charts detected a "slight" disturbance between St. Martin and St. Thomas on August 5.

On August 6, the developing storm was near the southeastern Bahamas, bringing moderate to rough seas. The cyclone turned northward after its close approach to the southeastern Bahamas. By August 10 a ship reported that winds were hurricane force. In the afternoon of August 11, the hurricane made landfall near Beaufort, South Carolina where it moved inland and turned just northeast of Savannah, Georgia between 5 and 6 p.m. on the same day. It was the area's worst storm in 29 years. Hurricane-force winds were witnessed between Savannah and Charleston. Weakening into a tropical storm that evening, for the next four or five days the storm meandered inland as a weak tropical storm before evolving into an extratropical cyclone on the evening of August 14.

Preparations and impact 

From August 7 and 9, small craft were advised to exercise caution over the eastern Bahamas and western subtropical Atlantic Ocean as the system approached the region.  By 9:30 a.m. on August 10, small craft warnings were in effect for the extreme northern Bahamas, and along the United States coast from Miami, Florida to Cape Hatteras, North Carolina.  By the morning of August 11, storm warnings were in effect from Wilmington, North Carolina northward to Cape Hatteras and from Savannah, Georgia to Fernandina Beach, Florida.  Hurricane warnings were in effect from Savannah northward to Wilmington.  All coastal warnings were dropped by August 12.

The cyclone inflicted $1.5 million in damage in Charleston, South Carolina, while Savannah, Georgia received $1 million in damage. Damage to the country's coastline totaled $3 million (1940 USD). Two people at Savannah died, one of whom from heart failure due to fright. The highest reported rainfall amount in Georgia was recorded was  one mile east of Louisville while the highest amount in South Carolina was reported from Charleston, where  fell. On the coastal areas where the hurricane hit, there was a considerable loss of life. Early press reports said that 35 had died. According to the Monthly Weather Review, the deaths were low because of hurricane warnings and evacuations. However, modern sources indicate that 50 people died during this storm.

After leaving the coast, the dissipating storm brought heavy rains that sparked disastrous flash floods. The floods inundated much of Tennessee, the Carolinas and northern Georgia. Rainfall amounts across western North Carolina exceeded , with the highest amount recorded at Idlewild, where  fell. Landslides were common in the mountains of western North Carolina, where it is considered a once in over 100 year landslide event. The East Tennessee and Western North Carolina railroad line was severed so badly it ceased operation. A total of 26 perished during the Deep Gap Debris Flow in Watauga County, North Carolina alone. Major portions of the county were cut off for two weeks. Debris flows and flooding cut off U.S. Highway 421 in 21 places through a six-mile stretch of roadway between Deep Gap and Maple Springs in Wilkes County, North Carolina. Flooding destroyed 90% of the bridges in Caldwell County, North Carolina. Press reports stated that 30 people died in the floods. Damage amounted to over $10 million (1940 USD).

Rains began in Virginia on August 13, as the system entered the state from the west. Deluges flooded locations across southern and western sections of the Old Dominion. Hampton Roads measured  of rainfall. The highest rainfall amount statewide was recorded at Copper Hill, where  fell. Mountain rivers and streams overflowed, washing out bridges and causing landslides which blocked roads. Several highways between Norfolk, southwest Virginia, and Asheville, North Carolina were closed.

See also 

 List of tropical cyclones
 List of wettest tropical cyclones in North Carolina
 Tropical cyclone

References

External links 
 Monthly Weather Review
 1940 Hurricane Track

South Carolina
1940 South
1940 South
1940 South
1940 South
1940 natural disasters in the United States
1940 in Tennessee
1940 in Georgia (U.S. state)
1940 in South Carolina